The Tennessee Department of Education (TDOE) is the state education agency of Tennessee. It is headquartered on the 6th floor of the Andrew Johnson Tower in Nashville. Dr. Penny Schwinn is the current Commissioner of Education. She has held that position since February 1, 2019, when she replaced Candice McQueen.

References

External links
 Tennessee Department of Education

Education in Tennessee
State departments of education of the United States
State agencies of Tennessee